Bertius is a monotypic genus of bush crickets in the subfamily Phaneropterinae.  The single species Bertius margaritatus Piza, 1974 was recorded from Turrialba, Costa Rica.

See also
Petrus Bertius

References

Phaneropterinae
Tettigoniidae genera
Monotypic Orthoptera genera